Leucarum was a coastal auxiliary fort in the Roman province of Britannia. Its remains are located beneath the town of Loughor in the Welsh city of Swansea.

The Romans built a rectangular or trapezoidal fort at the mouth of the River Loughor in the late 1st century to house a regiment of Roman auxiliary troops.

Stone defences were added to the earthen ditch and rampart by 110 and the fort was occupied until the middle or end of that century. However, it was later abandoned for a time and in the early 3rd century the ditch naturally silted up. It appears to have been brought back into use during the rule of Carausius who was worried about Irish raids, but was abandoned again before the 4th century. A Norman castle was later built on the site.

References

External links 
Roman artifact from Leucarum on Gathering the Jewels
Leucarum on the Roman-britain website

Roman fortifications in Swansea
Roman auxiliary forts in Wales